Uyarum Njan Nadake is a 1985 Indian Malayalam-language film directed by P. Chandrakumar and written by P. M. Thaj from a story by K. C. Prabhakaran. It was based on the book Keralathile Africa by K. Panoor. The film stars Mohanlal, Aruna, Venu Nagavally and Balan K. Nair in the lead roles. The film has musical score by K. P. N. Pillai. The film was a commercial success and Mohanlal's performance got critical acclaim.

Plot

Cast

Mohanlal as Darappan
Mucherla Aruna as Lasitha
Venu Nagavally as Vivek
Balan K. Nair as Nambyar
Chithra as Rajani
Kuthiravattam Pappu as Thampi
M. G. Soman as Master
Madhuri as Uppatti
Ramu as Rajendran
Soorya as Jagamma
T. G. Ravi as Kunjan
Vijayaraghavan as Raghu
Y. Vijaya as Vasumathi Amma
Bhagyalakshmi as Manja
Master Sona Balan as Palan
Santo Krishnan as Moopan
Kunjunni Kodakara as Mallan

Soundtrack
The music was composed by K. P. N. Pillai and the lyrics were written by O. N. V. Kurup.

References

External links
 

1985 films
1980s Malayalam-language films
Films directed by P. Chandrakumar